An RF modulator (or radio frequency modulator) is an electronic device whose input is a baseband signal which is used to modulate a radio frequency source.

RF modulators are used to convert signals from devices such as media players, VCRs and game consoles to a format that can be handled by a device designed to receive a modulated RF input, such as a radio or television receiver.

History 
Prior to the introduction of specialised video connector standards such as SCART, TVs were designed to only accept signals through the aerial connector: signals originate at a TV station, are transmitted over the air, and are then received by an antenna and demodulated within the TV. When equipment was developed which could use a television receiver as its display device, such as VCRs, DVD players, early home computers, and video game consoles, the signal was modulated and sent to the RF input connector.

The aerial connector is standard on all TV sets, even very old ones. Since later television designs include composite, S-Video, and component video jacks, which skip the modulation and demodulation steps, modulators are no longer included as standard equipment, and RF modulators are now largely a third-party product, purchased primarily to run newer equipment such as DVD players with an old television set.

Channels
A channel 3/4 output was a common output selection for consumer audiovisual devices sold in North America that were intended to be connected to a TV using a radio frequency (RF) signal. This channel option was provided because it was rare to have broadcast channels 3 and 4 used in the same market, or even just channel 3 itself. The choice allowed the user to select the unused channel in their area so that the connected device would be able to provide video and audio on an RF feed to the television without excessive interference from a broadcast signal.

Other countries had the RF output for video equipment on different groups of frequencies. For example, equipment sold in Europe, South Africa and Hong Kong used UHF channels 30–39 for this purpose. Equipment sold in Japan used channel 1 or 2 (Channel 13–16 is for cable converters). With other channels being used for RF modulation function in other regions, channel 3/4 output is a misnomer for those regions.

It also is common to have this type of RF output on video cassette recorders (VCRs), early DVD players, early video game consoles, and early home computers.

The VCR's ubiquity was responsible for making consumers familiar with RF modulation, which could explain its lasting popularity and use in all-digital media like DVD and video game consoles. A better explanation might be its familiarity and ease of use, along with legacy televisions, which did not have connections for composite or S-video.

DVD's relatively later entrance to the marketplace means that most players after the early generations do not natively support RF modulation, instead relying on converters, which could also amplify the signal.

First- through fourth-generation video game consoles commonly used this method to connect to the television, which was used as the audio and video device for the game, with some variations (the Atari 2600, for example, used a Channel 2/3 output switch). In many cases, an RF modulator was used to take the composite output from the game and modulate it before sending the signal to the television.

Recently, some RF demodulators have been marketed on obscure online markets to allow channel 3 inputs from legacy devices to work on RCA composite in.

Design 

RF modulation puts the desired information on to a carrier signal at a standardized frequency. Amplitude or frequency modulation may be used, as required by the receiving equipment.

Modulating a TV signal with stereo sound is relatively complex; most low-cost home TV modulators produce a signal with monaural audio. Even some units that have two or more audio inputs simply combine the left and right audio channels into one mono audio signal. Some used on very early home computers had no sound capability at all. Most cheaper modulators (i.e. not intended for professional use) lack vestigial sideband filtering.

TV modulators generally feature analog passthrough, meaning that they take input both from the device and from the usual antenna input, and the antenna input "passes through" to the TV, with minor insertion loss due to the added device. In some cases the antenna input is always passed through, while in other cases the antenna input is turned off when the device is outputting a signal, and only the device signal is sent onward, to reduce interference.

RF modulators produce a relatively poor picture, as image quality is lost during both the modulation from the source device, and the demodulation in the television.

Uses

Integrated modulators 

RF modulators are commonly integrated into VCRs, in video game consoles up to and including the fourth generation, and in 8- and 16-bit home computers.

Some systems were supplied with an external modulator unit that connected to both the system and to the antenna jacks of a television. One reason for this is that a device which outputs an RF signal must in general be certified by regulatory authorities—such as the U.S. Federal Communications Commission (FCC) — and thus by having an external RF modulator, only the modulator itself needed to be certified, rather than the entire video game system.

Broadcasting modulators 

RF modulators may also be used to take the audio and video signal from a PAL or NTSC composite video, RGB, YUV or other composite AV source, and generate a broadcast RF signal that can be fed into a television's aerial/coaxial connector.

Multi-channel RF modulators are commonly used in home audio/video distribution. These devices have multiple audio and video inputs and one RF output. Audio/video outputs from source devices such as a DVD player, VCR, or DSS receiver are connected to the audio/video inputs on the modulator. The modulator is then programmed to broadcast the signals on a certain frequency. That RF broadcast is then received by the connected TV. When the TV is tuned to the programmed channel, the video and audio signal of the source device is accessed. RF modulation can become difficult in a CATV system. High pass, low pass, and notch filters must be used to block certain frequencies, or channels, so that the modulator can broadcast the audio/video signal of the source device on that channel.

"Professional" modulators such as those used in the CATV industry generally include vestigial sideband filtering which is generally absent on "consumer" grade modulators.

Audio RF modulators are used in low-end car audio to add devices like CD changers without requiring dashboard hardware upgrades. For example, a portable CD player's headphone jack is connected to the modulator, which outputs a low-power FM radio signal that is played through the car radio. Car FM modulators suffer from loss of quality and interference issues.  Later devices which would use these types of modulators would be iPods and similar portable media players.

See also 
 List of video connectors
 Transmitter

References

External links 
 ni.com - RF and Communications Fundamentals
 maxim-ic.com - Conditioning A/V Signals for RF Modulation
 radagast.org - Modulation and Deviation
 radio-electronics.com - NFC Modulation & RF Signal

Audiovisual connectors
Consumer electronics
Video hardware